Muslim, also transliterated as Moslem or Müslüm (Turkish), is an Arabic male given name meaning 'pure, clear, immaculate, clean, taintless, straight, absolute', 'devout, god-fearing, pious, complaisant, obedient, submissive', 'virtuous, chaste, modest, blameless, innocent'. 

It is also the proper name for the followers of the religion Islam and solely a Muslim name.

The name Muslim is a diminutive of the name Aslam, which both names stems from the male noun-name Salaam.

It may refer to:

Given name

Moslem
 Moslem Bahadori (1927–2022), Iranian medical scientist
 Moslem Eskandar-Filabi (born 1944), Iranian wrestler 
 Moslem Al Freej (born 1988), Saudi footballer
 Moslem Firoozabadi, Iranian footballer
 Moslem Malakouti (1924–2014), Grand Ayatollah, Iranian Shiite cleric, Marja 
 Moslem Mesigar (born 1984), Iranian beach soccer player
 Moslem Mojademi, Iranian footballer 
 Moslem Niadoost (born 1990), Iranian middle-distance runner
 Moslem Oladghobad (born 1995), Iranian futsal player
 Moslem Rostamiha (born 1992), Iranian futsal player
 Moslem Uddin Ahmad, Bangladeshi politician

Muslim
Titular
 Abu Muslim, full name Abu Muslim Abd al-Rahman ibn Muslim al-Khurasani (born 718/19 or 723/27, died 755), Persian general in service of the Abbasid dynasty, who led the Abbasid Revolution that toppled the Umayyad dynasty
 Muslim ibn al-Hajjaj Nishapuri, d. 875 CE, hadith scholar
 Muslim ibn Aqil, Islamic figure, son of Aqil ibn Abi Talib and a member of the clan of Bani Hashim, thus, he is a cousin of Hussain ibn Ali
 Muslim ibn Shihab, Ibn Shihab al-Zuhri, Islamic figure, a central figure among the early collectors of sīra—biographies of the Islamic prophet, Muhammad and hadith literature
 Muslim ibn Uqba, (pre-622–683) was a general of the Umayyad Caliphate during the reigns of caliphs Mu'awiya I and his son and successor Yazid I
 Muslim ibn Sa'id al-Kilabi, was governor of Khurasan for the Umayyad Caliphate in 723–724.

Given name
 Muslim Agaýew (born 1974), Turkmenistani professional football 
 Muslim Ahmad (born 1989), Malaysian footballer 
 Muslim Arogundade (born 1926), Nigerian athlete
 Muslim Daliyev (born 1964), Russian footballer and football coach
 Muslim Magomayev (composer) (1885–1937), Azerbaijani composer and conductor
 Muslim Magomayev (musician) (1942–2008), dubbed the "King of Songs" and the "Soviet Sinatra", Soviet Azerbajiani baritone operatic pop singer
 Muslim Mubarak (born 1985), Iraqi footballer
 Muslim Salikhov, Russian martial artist
 Muslim Sattarov (born 1965), Uzbekistani ice dancer
 Muslim Yar (born 1999), German cricketer
Müslüm (Turkish or Turkic spelling)
 Müslüm Aydoğan (born 1989), Turkish footballer 
 Müslüm Can (born 1975), Turkish footballer
 Müslüm Doğan (born 1959), Turkish politician
 Müslüm Gürses (1953–2013), Turkish folk singer
 Müslüm Yelken (born 1988), Turkish footballer

Surname 
 Ahmed Abou Moslem (born 1981), Egyptian footballer
Azmi Muslim (born 1986), Malaysian footballer

See also
 Müslüm, Polatlı, village in the District of Polatlı, Ankara Province, Turkey
 Muğancıq Müslüm, village and municipality in the Sharur Rayon of Nakhchivan, Azerbaijan
 Christian (given name)
 Muslim (disambiguation)

Arabic masculine given names
Iranian masculine given names
Turkish masculine given names